Athletes from the Netherlands competed at the 1964 Winter Olympics in Innsbruck, Austria.

Medalists

Figure skating

Speed skating

Men

Women

References
Official Olympic Reports
International Olympic Committee results database
Olympic Winter Games 1964, full results by sports-reference.com

Nations at the 1964 Winter Olympics
1964
Olympics